During the East Timor independence referendum in 1999, pro-Indonesia militias refers to paramilitary militias in East Timor that were loyal to the Indonesian government. They operated during the final years of the Indonesian occupation of East Timor.

History
Pro-Indonesia militias were responsible for multiple atrocities and mass-killings during East Timor's bid for independence and transitional period. This led to the 1999 East Timorese crisis (known as the East Timor Scorched Earth campaign), which included notable incidents such as the Liquiçá Church, Manuel Carrascalão House, and Suai Church massacres. One of the most notorious militia leaders was Eurico Guterres, the leader of Aitarak, who was convicted and sentenced to ten years in prison for his participation in the Liquiçá Church massacre.

Militias
Notable militias included:

Aitarak (Thorn)
Besi Merah Putih (Red and White Iron)
Garda Muda Penegak Integrasi (Youth Guard for Upholding Integration)
Laksaur
Mati Hidup dengan Indonesia (Live and Die with Indonesia)

Fictional depictions
Fictional representations of these groups, their members, and their atrocities were shown in the 2006 Australian miniseries Answered by Fire.

See also

References

Indonesian occupation of East Timor
1990s in East Timor
Paramilitary organizations based in Indonesia
History of Timor